The FPO mark is a certification mark mandatory on all processed fruit products sold in India such as packaged fruit beverages, fruit-jams,  squashes, pickles, dehydrated fruit products, and fruit extracts, following the Food Safety and Standards Act of 2006. The FPO mark guarantees that the product was manufactured in a hygienic 'food-safe' environment, thus ensuring that the product is fit for consumption.

The standards have been in force since 1955 by the law of Fruit Products Order, after which the mark is named, but the mark itself got a mandatory status only after the Food Safety and Standards Act of 2006. A FPO license is, in fact, necessary to start a fruit processing industry in India. The agency that develops standards for this purpose and that which issues the mark is the Ministry of Food Processing Industries of the Government of India.

FPO's specific requirement  
 Containers and labeling requirement
 Limits of poisonous metals in fruit products
 List of permissible harmless food colors
 Limits for permitted preservatives in fruit products
 Other permitted additives

Application  
The important documents that are required to be submitted to the Ministry of Food Processing in India during the time of filing application are listed below:

 Product name
 Candidate name
 Corporation name
 Address
 Sample of product

References 

marks }India}The Fruit Products Order, 1955. (FPO) has been repealed as per section 97 (1) of The Food Safety & Standards Act , 2006 after 5th August 2011 the date on which it was enacted in India . The Food Safety & Standards Act , 2006

Agricultural marketing in India
Certification marks in India
in in India